Telegonus anaphus, the yellow-tipped flasher or dull astraptes, is a species of skipper butterfly in the subfamily Eudaminae. It is found from Argentina, north through Central America to the West Indies and Mexico. Strays can be found up to the lower Rio Grande Valley in Texas.

The wingspan is 51–64 mm. Adults are on wing from April to May and from September to November in southern Texas. There are many flights beginning in March in Mexico. In Costa Rica, it occurs during both the dry and wet seasons.

The larvae feed on vines in the Fabaceae.

Subspecies
The following subspecies are recognised:
 Telegonus anaphus anaphus - Suriname, Brazil (Bahia)
 Telegonus anaphus anausis - St. Vincent, Grenada, Dominica, Hispaniola, Cuba, Jamaica
 Telegonus anaphus aniza - Peru
 Telegonus anaphus annetta - from Texas to Peru
 Telegonus anaphus anoma - Trinidad

References

External links
nearctica

 
Hesperiidae of South America
Taxa named by Pieter Cramer